Rayalaseema (IAST: Rāyalasīma) is a geographic region in the Indian state of Andhra Pradesh.

Etymology 
The region was previously called Ceded districts during the rule of the British Raj. This is with reference to the time when the Nizam of Hyderabad, Ali Khan ceded the region to the British as a part of subsidiary alliance. Chilukuri Narayana Rao, a Telugu lecturer and activist from Anantapur deemed the term "ceded" as derogatory and coined the term Rayalaseema. In the Andhra Mahasabha and Ceded Districts Conference held at Nandyala in November 1928, he moved a resolution to the effect which was accepted by the other delegates of the conference.

The name Rayalaseema hearkened back to the Vijayanagara times, whose Kings used a suffix Rāya (tadbhava of Sanskrit Rāja) or Rāyalu in Telugu as their title. The boundaries of Rayalaseema roughly match with the territorial extent of the Aravidu dynasty, the last dynasty to rule the Vijayanagara Empire.

History 
During the British era, the Nizam of Hyderabad ceded this area to the British, and hence was called Ceded Districts. Upon Independence, it was renamed as Rayalaseema as 'seema' was an administrative territorial entity of the Vijayanagara Empire similar to today's districts.

Post independence 

The four districts of the region were part of the Madras Presidency until 1953. From 1953 to 1956, the region was a part of Andhra State and in 1956, the Telangana region was merged with Andhra State to form Andhra Pradesh State. On 2 February 1970, three taluks from Kurnool i.e., Markapur, Cumbum and Giddalur were merged along with some other taluks of Nellore district and Guntur district to form Prakasam district.

In February 2014, the Andhra Pradesh Reorganisation Act, 2014 bill was passed by the Parliament of India for the formation of Telangana state comprising ten districts. Hyderabad will remain as a joint capital for 10 years for both Andhra Pradesh and Telangana. The new State of Telangana came into existence on 2 June 2014 after approval from the President of India. The formation of a new state named Telangana from Andhra Pradesh is not considered an amendment to the Constitution of India per article 3 and 4 of that document.

Geography 
Rayalaseema region is located in the southern region of the state of Andhra Pradesh. The region borders the state of Tamil Nadu to the south, Karnataka to the west and Telangana to the north. Some areas in Coastal Andhra, such as Markapur revenue division, Tirupati district which share similar geography,culture and climate to Rayalaseema.

Spiritual destinations 
Rayalaseema has many important places of pilgrimage. Tirumala Venkateswara Temple, abode of Lord Venkateswara is one of the richest and the most visited place of worship in the world. The other being Srisailam, Ahobilam, Srikalahasti, Kanipakam, Kadiri, Rayadurgam, Penna Ahobilam, Mahanandi, Mantralayam, Proddatur, Puttaparthi, Yaganti, Lepakshi, Vontimitta, Bramhamgarimatham, Pushpagiri, Nagalapuram, Narayanavanam, etc.

Shahi Jamia Masjid in Adoni is one of the oldest constructions in South India, built around 1662 AD by Siddi Masood Khan.

Education

Universities 
 Sri Venkateswara University
 Sri Krishna Devaraya University
 Yogi Vemana University
 Rayalaseema University
 Dr. Abdul Haq Urdu University
 Dravidian University
 Sri Padmavati Mahila Visvavidyalayam
 JNTU Anantapur
 Sanskrit Vidyapeeth

Medical colleges 

 Sri Venkateswara Medical College
 Rajiv Gandhi Institute of Medical Sciences, Kadapa
 Kurnool Medical College
 Government Medical College, Anantapur

Central institutions 
 Indian Institute of Technology, Tirupati
 Indian Institute of Science Education and Research, Tirupati
 Indian Culinary Institute, Tirupati
 National Sanskrit University
 Indian Institute of Information Technology, Design and Manufacturing, Kurnool
 Central University of Andhra Pradesh

Deemed universities 
   Sri Sathya Sai University

Infrastructure

Roadways 

The road network in region consists of many National Highways such as, NH 40, NH 42, NH 44, NH 140, NH 167, NH 340, NH 67, NH 69, NH 71, NH 716.

Railways 

The rail connectivity is getting better with the projects allocated or being part of the region such as, Nandyal–Yerraguntla, Nadikudi–Srikalahasti, Kadapa–Bangalore sections are the under development projects which forms a part of the region. Most of the region falls under the jurisdiction of Guntakal railway division of South Central Railway zone.

Airports 

Rayalaseema region has air connectivity with four airports Tirupati International Airport, Sri Sathya Sai Airport, Kadapa Airport and Kurnool Airport.

Power 

Rayalaseema Region has thermal as well solar power plants. Rayalaseema Thermal Power Station is located in Kadapa district and Andhra Pradesh government recently sanctioned solar power parks in Rayalaseema districts with a capacity of 4000MW's.Today the state of Andhra Pradesh stood No.1 position in solar power generation with an installed capacity of 1868 MW In India and also offers world's largest solar power park of 1000 MW is also located in Andhra Pradesh.

Lake 
The only Lake located in the region of Rayalaseema is Pulicat Lake. The major part of the Lake is located in Sullurpeta division of Tirupati district.

Pulicat Lake is the second largest brackish water lagoon in India, (after Chilika Lake), measuring 759 square kilometres (293 sq mi). Major part of the lagoon comes under Tirupati district of Andhra Pradesh. The lagoon is one of the three important wetlands to attract northeast monsoon rain clouds during the October to December season. The lagoon comprises the following regions, which adds up 759 square kilometres (293 sq mi) according to Andhra Pradesh.

Politics 
Neelam Sanjiva Reddy, Damodaram Sanjivayya, Nedurumalli Janardhana Reddy, Kotla Vijaya Bhaskara Reddy, N. Chandrababu Naidu, Y. S. Rajasekhara Reddy, N.Kiran Kumar Reddy and Y. S. Jagan Mohan Reddy are the people who served as Chief Minister of Andhra Pradesh, hail from the Rayalaseema region of the state, with Y. S. Jagan Mohan Reddy being the incumbent. The region saw as many as 7 chief ministers for the state.\

Factionalism 
Rayalaseema is home to numerous factional families who are often intertwined with political parties and violently clash with each other. Government employees are known to dread postings in the region. The high crime rate is attributed to Rayalaseema's high poverty rate. Although violence has declined since the 1980s, factionalism still reigns supreme. Police records estimate that in the past 35 years, about 8,465 civilians have died as a result of factional violence.

Sri Bagh act 
Based on Sri Bagh act signed on 18 November 1937, Kurnool was made as the capital of the new state after the division of Andhra state from the Madras state. As per the second State Resolution Commission, capital was shifted to Hyderabad upon the formation of Andhra Pradesh.

See also 
 Coastal Andhra
 Uttarandhra

References

External links

Further reading 

 
Regions of Andhra Pradesh
Proposed states and union territories of India
Geography of Anantapur district
Geography of Chittoor district
Geography of Kadapa district
Geography of Kurnool district
Geography of Tirupati district